The 1897 Washington & Jefferson football team was an American football team that represented Washington & Jefferson College as an independent during the 1897 college football season.  Led by Clinton Woods in his second and final year as head coach, the team compiled a record of 10–1, shutting out their opponents in all ten victories.

Schedule

References

Washington and Jefferson
Washington & Jefferson Presidents football seasons
Washington and Jefferson football